Pieman may refer to:
 Isabelle Pieman, born 1983, a Belgian figure skater.
 Pieman River, a river in Australia.
 Lake Pieman, a lake in Australia.
 Pie (children's game), also known as Pieman, Pieman.

See also
 Andy Smith (darts player), who uses the Pie Man sobriquet.
 Simple Simpson, that features the Pie Man character.
 "The Pi Man", a short story by Alfred Bester